Seattle City Hall (also known as the Seattle Municipal Building) is the home of the offices of the mayor and city council of Seattle, Washington, located between 4th Avenue and 5th Avenue in the downtown area of the city. Most city departments have their offices in the nearby Seattle Municipal Tower. In 2003, the Seattle city government moved into a new, "green" city hall building. Until 1962, the city government operated from the King County Courthouse, alongside the King County government.  The new City Hall and Plaza, together with the adjacent Seattle Municipal Tower, Seattle Justice Center, and (unbuilt) Civic Square, comprise the Seattle Civic Center.

Awards
 2005 U.S. Green Building Council: LEED-NC v2 Gold
 2005 AIA Seattle: Commendation for Design
 2006 AIA Washington Civic Design Awards: Honor Award 
 2006 American Institute of Steel Construction IDEAS Awards Program: Merit Award
 2007 AIA Northwest & Pacific Region: Merit Award

Gallery

See also
 Black Lives Matter street mural (Seattle City Hall)

References

External links

 Seattle City Hall website
 Seattle Civic Center website
 U.S. Green Building Council
 AIA Seattle Honor Awards 2005

Government buildings in Seattle
City halls in Washington (state)
Leadership in Energy and Environmental Design gold certified buildings
Tourist attractions in Seattle
Downtown Seattle